The Bing Crosby International Classic was a golf tournament on the LPGA Tour from 1974 to 1975. It was played at the San Isidro Country Club in Guadalajara, Mexico.

Winners
1975 Sue Roberts
1974 Jane Blalock

References

Former LPGA Tour events
Golf tournaments in Mexico
1974 establishments in Mexico
1975 disestablishments in Mexico
Recurring sporting events established in 1974
Recurring sporting events disestablished in 1975
Guadalajara, Jalisco
Women's sport in Mexico